Cyrtodactylus elok, also known as the Malaysia bow-fingered gecko, white-eyed forest gecko, or beautiful bent-toed gecko,  is a species of gecko that is endemic to southern Thailand and western Malaysia.

References 

Cyrtodactylus
Reptiles described in 1979